Sirpur  is a village in Kondagaon tehsil, Bastar district, Chhattisgarh, India.

Demographics
In the 2001 India census, the village of Sirpur had a population of 772, with 382 males (49.5%) and 390 females (50.5%), for a gender ratio of 1021 females per thousand males.

References

Villages in Kondagaon district